Rafiu Jafojo (6 December 1935 – 23 April 2016) was a Nigerian politician. He was the deputy governor of Lagos State from 1979 to 1983.

Early life and career 
He worked as a building inspector with the Ikeja Town Planning Authority. He left for England In 1961 where he got a National Certificate in Building Engineering from Hackney Technical College in 1966 and Higher National Certificate from Brixon School of Engineering. In 1969, he obtained an Advanced Certificate in Building Technology from Northern Polytechnic, Holloway (now University of North London) in 1970.

On 1 October 1979, Jafojo, alongside Lateef Jakande was sworn in as the first democratically elected deputy governor of Lagos.

Memorial 
The Rafiu Jafojo Park in Shasha Alimosho, Lagos was commissioned in December 2017 in Rafiu's memory.

References 

1935 births
2016 deaths
Lagos State politicians